The 1040s was a decade of the Julian Calendar which began on January 1, 1040, and ended on December 31, 1049.

Significant people
 King Macbeth of Scotland (d. 1057)
 Godwin, Earl of Wessex (d. 1053)
 El Cid (b. 1040)
 Yaroslav I the Wise
 Al-Qa'im (caliph of Baghdad)

References